The Russian American Line was a subsidiary steamship line of the East Asiatic Company that was in business from 1900 until the time of the Russian Revolution in 1917. In 1906 it began passenger service from Libau to New York after the Hamburg America Line acquired a controlling interest in the line.

After the Russian Revolution, services ended in 1917. Some of the line's ships came under control of the Cunard Line and were operated as troopships during World War I and the Allied intervention in the Russian Civil War. After the civil war most of the line's ships were sold or transferred to the Baltic American Line, another subsidiary of the East Asiatic Company.

Ships of the Russian American Line

  (1896)
  (1894)
  (1912)
 SS Czaritza (1915)
  (1897)
  (1889)
  (1893)
  (1899)
  (1892)
 SS Kursk (1910)
  (1889)
  (1902)
 SS Russia (1908)

References 
 

Transport companies established in 1900
Defunct shipping companies
Shipping companies of Russia
Defunct companies of Russia
Transatlantic shipping companies
1900 establishments in the Russian Empire